United Spinal Association is a nonprofit membership, disability rights and veterans service organization in the United States. It was formed in 1946 as Eastern Paralyzed Veterans Association by a group of paralyzed World War II veterans from New York City.

United Spinal Association is recognized by the US Department of Veterans Affairs as a veterans' service organization; as such, United Spinal Association is authorized to prepare, present and prosecute claims for veterans benefits from the local VA regional office level to the Supreme Court. United Spinal Association's veterans service program is entitled VetsFirst.

History
In 1948, 70 members of Eastern Paralyzed Veterans Association (EPVA) held a public demonstration in New York’s Grand Central Station to gather signatures supporting the nation’s first accessible housing bill (Public Law 702) to get federal funds to build accessible homes for paralyzed veterans.

In 1968, EPVA advocates for equal access to federally-funded buildings and facilities for wheelchair users and all Americans living with disabilities, leading to the passage of Architectural Barriers Act of 1968.

In 1970, Executive Director James J. Peters set out to expose the deplorable conditions on the spinal cord injury units at the Bronx Veterans Hospital, culminating in a Life magazine expose, the creation of the US Department of Veterans Affairs's dedicated Spinal Cord Injury Service. In addition, the Bronx Veterans Hospital was modernized, and now bears Mr. Peters' name as the James J. Peters VA Medical Center.

In 1987, in conjunction with Paralyzed Veterans of America, United Spinal Association helped found and continues to underwrite spinal cord injury research at the Yale Center for Neuroscience and Regeneration Research. This center remains under direction of Dr. Stephen Waxman.

United Spinal played a role in writing portions of the Americans with Disabilities Act of 1990, the landmark civil rights law that prohibits discrimination based on disability.

Among the group's past and present members are Lex Frieden, Junius Kellogg and Frank Genese.

Programs
United Spinal's Spinal Cord Resource Center offers visitors the opportunity to submit questions to experienced information specialists on any aspect of living with spinal cord injuries or disorders or get information and resources to resolve a situation that impacts health, independence and quality of life.

United Spinal offers members access to local chapter and peer support groups that promote inclusion and independence, organize local events and projects, advocate for rights and accessibility, and offer information and support.

Other services and programs include:
 VetsFirst: advice and advocacy services for veterans
 Accessibility Services
 Advocacy
 Pathways to Employment program
 Tech Access program
 Emergency preparedness/disaster relief

References

External links
United Spinal Association web site
Department of Veterans Affairs recognition of United Spinal Association as a veterans' service organization

1946 establishments in the United States
American veterans' organizations
Organizations established in 1946